The coahuilix de Hubbs snail, scientific name Coahuilix hubbsi, is a species of small freshwater snails that have an operculum, aquatic gastropod mollusks in the family Hydrobiidae. This species is endemic to Mexico.

References

Coahuilix
Endemic molluscs of Mexico
Gastropods described in 1966
Taxonomy articles created by Polbot